USS LST-555 was a United States Navy  in commission from 1944 to 1946.

Construction and commissioning
LST-555 was laid down on 5 February 1944 at Evansville, Indiana, by the Missouri Valley Bridge and Iron Company. She was launched on 22 March 1944, sponsored by Mrs. R. E. Sharp, and commissioned on 28 April 1944.

Service history
During World War II, LST-555 was assigned to the Pacific Theater of Operations.  She participated in the capture and occupation of the southern Palau Islands in September and October 1944.  She then took part in the Philippines campaign, participating in the Leyte landings in October and November 1944 and the landings at Zambales and Subic Bay in January 1945. She then participated in the assault on and occupation of Okinawa Gunto in April 1945.

Following the war, LST-555 performed occupation duty in the Far East. She was badly damaged by grounding off Wakayama, Japan, on 18 September 1945.

Decommissioning and disposal
LST-555 was decommissioned on 6 January 1946 and stricken from the Navy List on 21 January 1946. Her hulk was destroyed by gunfire on 26 January 1946.

Honors and awards
LST-555 earned four battle stars for her World War II service.

References

NavSource Online: Amphibious Photo Archive LST-555

LST-542-class tank landing ships
World War II amphibious warfare vessels of the United States
Ships built in Evansville, Indiana
1944 ships